Nguyễn Văn Châu (born 24 August 1940) is a former Vietnamese cyclist. He competed in the men's sprint at the 1964 Summer Olympics.

References

External links
 

1940 births
Living people
Vietnamese male cyclists
Olympic cyclists of Vietnam
Cyclists at the 1964 Summer Olympics
Place of birth missing (living people)